Roxborough State Park is a state park of Colorado, United States, known for dramatic red sandstone formations. In 1980 it was recognized as a National Natural Landmark.

Geography
Roxborough State Park, a  Colorado State Park, is known for dramatic red sandstone formations. In 1980 it was recognized as a National Natural Landmark because of the number of ecological systems and geological formations. It is also a State Historic Site and National Cultural District because of the number of archaeological sites.

Climate

According to the Köppen Climate Classification system, Roxborough State Park has an oceanic climate, abbreviated "Cfb" on climate maps.

Geology
Roxborough State Park is a designated Colorado Natural Area and National Natural Landmark for its 300-million-year-old red sandstone Fountain Formations that tilt at a 60 degree angle.  The park includes great examples of exposed Precambrian to Late Mesozoic hogback, monolithic and spire formations from the Permian, Pennsylvanian and Cretaceous age.  Carpenter Peak's exposed monzonite is from the Precambrian era.

Flora and fauna
The park consists of forests of ponderosa pine and Douglas fir, prairie land, and woodlands that support many forms of wildlife. There are 145 bird, over 50 butterfly and moth, and 11 amphibian and reptile species. Mammals commonly found in the park include black bear, coyote, deer, elk, fox, mountain lion, prairie dog, and rabbit. Sources of water include Little Willow Creek, Willow Creek and Mill Gulch.

Visitors
The park has visitors center with exhibits, a bookstore, and restrooms.

There are six hiking trails in Roxborough State Park, a network of easy to moderate trails that also connect to Douglas County trail system, Pike National Forest and Waterton Canyon trails.

See also
 Colorado State Parks
 Roxborough State Park Archaeological District

References

External links

Roxborough State Park

State parks of Colorado
Fountain Formation
National Natural Landmarks in Colorado
Protected areas of Douglas County, Colorado
Protected areas established in 1975
Rock formations of Colorado
Landforms of Douglas County, Colorado